Boston College is a predominantly further education college in Boston in Lincolnshire, England. It is a Centre of Vocational Excellence (CoVE) for Early Years Care.

History
Boston College opened in 1964 to provide A-level courses for those not attending the town's two grammar schools.

In 2007 a scheme for college redevelopment on West Street was abandoned through a lack of usable space. In 2008 the college planned for a £79m expansion of the college to replace the Skirbeck Road and Mill Road sites. A smaller redevelopment of the Skirbeck Road site was undertaken, funded by selling the building on Mill Road. The Mill Road building at the east of Boston was a former De Montfort University campus, and before that, Kitwood Boys School, now Haven High Academy. The adjacent Mill Road sports fields were not included in the sale.

Sites
The college is currently spread over five sites:
 Rochford Campus – engineering workshops, beauty therapy, swimming facilities and halls of residence for 200 students. Skirbeck Road, Boston, next to the Maud Foster Drain and the Geoff Moulder Leisure Complex.
 Sam Newsom Centre – music and performing arts facilities. South Street, Boston.
 Peter Paine Performance Centre – centre for sports and exercise science. Rosebery Avenue, Boston.
 Ingelow Centre – centre for students with Special Educational Needs. Rowley Road, Boston.
Boston College Spalding – Red Lion Street, Spalding.

Principals
 1964 – 86 – Alan Moon
 1986 – 2001 – David Pursell
 2001 – 05 – David Pomfret
 2005 – 11 – Sue Daley
 2011 – 17 – Amanda Mosek
 2017 – 2020 – Jo Maher
 2020 – Current – Claire Foster

Notable alumni
 Jason Atherton – chef
 Simon Bonwick (1986–87) – Michelin-starred Chef

References

External links
 The college's website
 EduBase

News items
 Plans for food centre in Spalding in July 2009
 Abi Titmuss musical banned in May 2006

Video clips
 Breakfast competition at Bishop Grossteste College in October 2009

Further education colleges in Lincolnshire
Educational institutions established in 1964
Education in Boston, Lincolnshire
1964 establishments in England
Buildings and structures in Boston, Lincolnshire